Cecil Henry Holden-White (3 November 1860 – 21 September 1934) was an English international footballer, who played as a left half.

Life
He was born in Harold House on Lansdown Road in Kensington, the son of Henry White (d.1900) and his Swiss wife, Eleanor D'Ouchy (d.1912). He attended Brentwood School. His father was a wine merchant and Cecil originally trained as this.

As a footballer he first played for Clapham Rovers then Swifts.

White played for Corinthian F.C. from 1882 to 1891 and was their first captain. He earned two caps playing for England in 1888.

Family

He was nephew (or great nephew) of the geologist Rev Francis Le Grix White FRSE FGS, and was executor of his will.

References

1860 births
1934 deaths
English footballers
England international footballers
Corinthian F.C. players
Association football wing halves
Clapham Rovers F.C. players